Perhaps is the third studio album by Scottish post-punk and pop band the Associates, released on 8 February 1985 by WEA. It is their first album without founding member, keyboardist and guitarist Alan Rankine.

Background
With the departure of Alan Rankine and bassist Michael Dempsey, the Associates were effectively a Billy Mackenzie solo project for this album. MacKenzie started work with Steve Reid, a guitarist from Dundee and Howard Hughes, an accomplished keyboardist in late 1982 after the departure of Rankine and came up with an album's worth of material.

Recording
The recording sessions were chaotic, and the resulting album was deemed unreleasable by Warner Music Group, who demanded further work be carried out on the project. The master tapes for this version went missing over the Christmas period in 1982 (allegedly hidden by Mackenzie due to his own dissatisfaction with the record). The album was restarted from scratch and was finally finished after a further two years in early 1985, featuring four different producers and at a total final cost of approximately £250,000 to complete, an uncommonly major expense, even for a major label record, at that time.

Release
Perhaps was released on 9 February 1985. The album was a commercial failure in comparison to their previous releases, peaking at No. 23 on the UK Albums Chart but only selling around 40,000 copies, putting Billy MacKenzie in significant debt to Warner Music Group.

For years Perhaps was only available on vinyl and cassette. However, due to the reissue program of Associates material after Mackenzie's death, it was re-released along with the unreleased The Glamour Chase album in a double CD package in 2002. The bonus instrumentals included on the original cassette release were not included.

On 3 January 2020, it was announced via the Super Deluxe Edition website that a completely new remastered 'deluxe' edition of the album was to be released via pre order via Cherry Red Records on 31 January 2020 marking the first ever stand alone CD release of the album. This two-CD reissue features the original 10-track album on CD 1 along with the four cassette-only instrumentals from 1985. The second disc includes what the label describe as "all the related bonus tracks for which master tapes still exist". These comprise extended versions, edits, B-sides and instrumentals. 11 tracks are new to CD. This deluxe edition comes as a digipak with a 20-page booklet, with sleeve notes courtesy of Andy Davis.

Critical reception

Trouser Press wrote "To write it off with a snide 'perhaps not' would be a cheap shot, but more than generous", calling it "undanceable dance music with a few ho-hum twists. The lyrics include strange, gratuitous, incomprehensible non sequiturs; the music is at best uninvolving, even if you listen for sheer sound and ignore the pose."

Track listing

Cassette issues included instrumental versions of "Perhaps", "Thirteen Feelings", "The Stranger in Your Voice" and "Breakfast" (titled "Breakfast Alone")

2020 Deluxe CD Issue

Personnel
Credits are adapted from the Perhaps liner notes.

 Billy Mackenzie – vocals
 Steve Reid – guitar
 L. Howard Hughes — keyboards
 Roberto Soave — bass guitar on "Thirteen Feelings", "The Stranger in Your Voice" and "The Best of You"
 Steve Goulding — drums on "Schampout" and "Helicopter Helicopter"
 Gaspar Lawal — percussion on "Schampout"
 Jim Russell — extra percussion on "Schampout"
 Ian McIntosh — guitar on "Those First Impressions"
 Simon House  — electric violin on "Perhaps"
 Alan Whetton — saxophone on "Waiting for the Loveboat"
 Eddi Reader — guest lead vocals on "The Best of You"
 Christine Beveridge — backing vocals on "Perhaps"
 L. Howard Hughes — backing vocals on "Perhaps"
 Martyn Ware — backing vocals on "Perhaps"
 Steve Reid — backing vocals on "Perhaps"
 Lynton Naiff — string arrangements on "Breakfast" and "Thirteen Feelings"

Production and artwork
 Martin Rushent – production (tracks A2, B1-B4)
 Dave Allen – production (tracks A4, A5, B5)
 Martyn Ware and Greg Walsh – production (tracks A1, A3)
 Achim Elsner – mastering engineer
 Richard Haughton — photography

Charts

References

External links
 

The Associates (band) albums
1985 albums
Albums produced by Martin Rushent
Albums produced by David M. Allen
Warner Music Group albums